Mission Woods is a city in Johnson County, Kansas, United States, and part of the Kansas City Metropolitan Area.  As of the 2020 census, the population of the city was 203.

History
Mission Woods had its start in the 1930s when J.C. Nichols laid out the subdivision and started building. It was named from a Native American mission established at the site in the 19th century, and from the scenic wooded setting.

Mission Woods became a Google Fiber "fiberhood" in 2014.

Geography
Mission Woods is located at  (39.033188, -94.613003).

Demographics

2010 census
As of the census of 2010, there were 178 people, 77 households, and 53 families living in the city. The racial makeup of the city was 97.8% White, 0.6% African American, and 1.7% Asian.

There were 77 households, of which 24.7% had children under the age of 18 living with them, 62.3% were married couples living together, 6.5% had a female householder with no husband present, and 31.2% were non-families. 26.0% of all households were made up of individuals, and 16.9% had someone living alone who was 65 years of age or older. The average household size was 2.31 and the average family size was 2.79.

The median age in the city was 54.5 years. 18.5% of residents were under the age of 18; 5.1% were between the ages of 18 and 24; 17.4% were from 25 to 44; 32.7% were from 45 to 64; and 26.4% were 65 years of age or older. The gender makeup of the city was 44.9% male and 55.1% female.

2000 census
As of the census of 2000, there were 165 people, 77 households, and 51 families living in the city. The racial makeup of the city was 96.97% White, 1.82% African American, 1.21% from other races.

There were 77 households, out of which 16.9% had children under the age of 18 living with them, 62.3% were married couples living together, 2.6% had a female householder with no husband present, and 32.5% were non-families. 29.9% of all households were made up of individuals, and 16.9% had someone living alone who was 65 years of age or older. The average household size was 2.14 and the average family size was 2.65.

In the city, the population was spread out, with 18.8% under the age of 18, 1.8% from 18 to 24, 10.3% from 25 to 44, 42.4% from 45 to 64, and 26.7% who were 65 years of age or older. The median age was 54 years. For every 100 females, there were 94.1 males. For every 100 females age 18 and over, there were 88.7 males.

The median income for a household in the city was $106,885, and the median income for a family was $181,456. Males had a median income of $100,000 versus $60,625 for females. The per capita income for the city was $68,713. None of the population or families were below the poverty line.

Transportation

Major highways

Government
The Mission Woods government consists of a mayor and five council members.  The council meets the 1st Tuesday of each month at 7PM.

Libraries
The Johnson County Library serves residents of Mission Woods.

References

Further reading

External links
 City of Mission Woods
 Mission Woods - Directory of Public Officials
 Kansas City metro area map, KDOT

Cities in Kansas
Cities in Johnson County, Kansas